Williamsport is an unincorporated community in northwestern Madison Township, Columbiana County, Ohio, United States.

History
Williamsport was platted in 1835 by William Crawford, and named for him. An old variant name was Park. A post office called Park was established in 1890, and remained in operation until 1902.

Education
Williamsport is home to the Beaver Local School District. The confluence that forms the Little Beaver Creek is in the center of the community.

References

Unincorporated communities in Ohio
Unincorporated communities in Columbiana County, Ohio
1835 establishments in Ohio
Populated places established in 1835